The Port of Southampton  is a passenger and cargo port in the central part of the south coast of England. The modern era in the history of the Port of Southampton began when the first dock was inaugurated in 1843. The port has been owned and operated by Associated British Ports since 1982, and is the busiest cruise terminal and second largest container port in the UK. The volume of port traffic categorises Southampton as a Medium-Port City globally.

The port is ten miles inland, between the confluence of the rivers Test and Itchen and the head of the mile-wide drowned valley known as Southampton Water. The mouth of the inlet is protected from the effects of foul weather by the mass of the Isle of Wight, which gives the port a sheltered location. Additional advantages include a densely populated hinterland and close proximity to London, and excellent rail and road links to the rest of Britain which bypass the congestion of London.

The average tidal range is approximately 5 feet (1.5 metres), with 17 hours per day of rising water thanks to the port's "double tides". These allow the largest container and cruise ships access to the port for up to 80 per cent of the time, according to the container terminal operator DP World Southampton.  The effect is a result of tidal flow through the English Channel: high tide at one end of the Channel (Dover) occurs at the same time as low tide at the other end (Land's End). Points near the centre have one high water as the tidal swell goes from left to right, another as it then goes from right to left.  Neither is as high as the one at each end.

The principal berths are divided into three areas, The Old Dock at the junction of the Rivers Test and Itchen consisting of berths 20–49; The New Dock, known as the Western Dock, built by the Southern Railway consisting of Berths 101–110; and the Container Terminal consisting of berths 201–207. The container terminal was constructed entirely on reclaimed land, with berth 201 opening in 1968.

The berths at the container terminal have since been renamed. Berths 207 to 204 are now berths SCT 1 to 4 respectively and the reconstructed berths 201/202 now SCT 5.

History

Cruise shipping

Passenger terminals

There are five active passenger terminals in the port of Southampton servicing passenger ships. 

 Queen Elizabeth II Terminal, berth 38/39 opened 1966, modernised 2003 and 2016.
 Mayflower Terminal, berth 106 opened 1960, modernised 2003 and 2015
 City Terminal, berth 101 opened 2003, upgraded 2007
 Ocean Terminal, berth 46 opened 2009
 Horizon Cruise Terminal, berth 102, opened summer 2021

In addition to the passenger terminals, Berth 104 (Fruit Terminal) is generally used for fruit transport but has been used for passenger ships during busy times.

Operators
The first full-time cruise ship was Ceylon, a P&O liner converted in 1881. Up to this point ship owners had occasionally used liners for off-season cruising. From 1881 the growth of the cruise industry proceeded slowly until the 1970s when major shipping operators became badly affected by the rise in popularity of longhaul jet air travel. Faced with falling demand for their mail and passengers services they turned their business to holiday cruises – voyages that usually end where they begin, providing short leisure visits to other ports on the way.

In the case of Southampton at the time ships affected included Cunard's Queen Elizabeth 2 and the P&O vessels SS Oriana and SS Canberra: all originally built as fast liners, they began to offer a growing variety of cruises. Through the 1990s cruising's growing popularity saw huge increases in ship size and numbers as well as terminal capacity, with Southampton becoming one of the busiest cruise ports in the world.

Cruise ship sizes have risen substantially in recent years. In 2005, the number of passengers using the port totalled 738,000, higher than it had been in any one year of the previous century. Since then it has increased year on year, and the figure for 2019 was 1.9 million passengers, representing approximately 520 calls by passenger ships. On average, each docking is worth £1.25 million to the local economy. The Port of Southampton is the busiest cruise turnaround port in Northern Europe.

Southampton is the base of these cruise ships:
P&O Cruises – , Arvia,  
Celebrity Cruises – Celebrity Silhouette
Cunard – , 
Princess Cruises – Royal Princess, Sky Princess
Royal Caribbean – 

and the ocean liner:
 Cunard – Queen Mary 2

In addition, Southampton is a regular port of call for ships of other cruise companies, including:

AIDA - German cruise line part of Carnival - fourteen ships
Azamara Cruises - four luxury ships
Fred. Olsen Cruise Lines – four smaller ships
Crystal Cruises – based in Los Angeles; three luxury ships
Costa Cruises– part of Carnival; Italian flag; eleven ships
Disney Cruise Line - based in Florida; five ships
MSC Cruises - eighteen ships; Italian based;
Norwegian Cruise Line - seventeen ships; headquarters in Miami.
Oceania Cruises - six luxury ships (part of NCL); headquarters in Miami.
Regent Seven Seas Cruises - nine luxury ships (part of NCL) headquarters in Miami.
Saga Cruises – two ships Spirit of Adventure  and Spirit of Discovery, offering cruises for the over-50s
Silversea Cruises – Monaco based; Italian flag owned by Royal Caribbean Cruise Line; six ships.
TUI Cruises – based in Germany, six ships.

Freight and cargo

Containers
The container terminal is operated by DP World Southampton. Loading and unloading operations can be performed simultaneously on four large deep-sea container ships, plus one smaller ship  in length.

This container terminal is Britain's second largest deep-sea terminal, after that at Felixstowe. The railway line from Southampton has been upgraded to the relatively large W10 loading gauge on the route between the container port and the ABP terminal in Birmingham, where it links with lines that have already received this treatment. This allows the railway line to handle the taller containers now in widespread use.

Permission was obtained from the Marine Management Organisation to extend the container terminal into berths 201 and 202. The quay was rebuilt in 2014 to accommodate  vessels. This enabled the berths to accommodate the largest container vessels in service. Work on the project was undertaken by VolkerStevin, part of the VolkerWessels group.

On 20 September 2013, it was announced that Channel Island Lines would continue the "lift-on lift-off" container service between Southampton and Jersey and would purchase the MV Huelin Dispatch from Associated British Ports who in turn had purchased her from the receiver of the Huelin-Renouf bankruptcy.

Vehicles

The port has facilities for the import and export of vehicles. Seven multi-storey car park type storage facilities have been constructed, to provide  of above-ground storage (with another under construction as of 2019). Roll on – roll off vehicle transporters serve all parts of the world; car trains as well as car transporter lorries provide vehicle transport to and from the port within Britain. Southampton has been the UK's leading port for vehicle exports in recent years.

Bulk cargos
The terminal for bulk goods handles over a million tons annually. A facility processes waste glass into glass cullet, suitable for making new glass bottles. A Rank Hovis flour mill deals with 70,000 tons (tonnes) of wheat each year. Crushed rocks, gravel, sand, fertilisers, grains and scrap are also handled.

Perishable foods
The port handles 80,000 tons (tonnes) of such produce, much of it from the Canary Isles, each year.

Oil and petroleum products

The Esso refinery at Fawley is the largest in the country, providing 20 per cent of the nation's capacity. Its mile-long marine terminal handles 2000 ship movements and 22 million tons (tonnes) of crude oil annually, making it the largest independently owned docks facility in Europe. A direct pipeline, completed in 1972, connects the refinery with the West London Terminal in Hounslow, supplying aviation fuel for Heathrow Airport. A replacement pipeline, due for completion in 2023, is under construction.

The BP Oil Terminal at Hamble provides storage and distribution facilities for crude oil and refined petroleum products. The crude oil arrives by pipeline, and leaves in sea tankers, destined for refineries; refined products reach the terminal by ship and pipeline and are then distributed to customers by road tanker, ship and pipeline.

Local ferries

Cross-Solent ferries

Red Funnel (The Southampton Isle of Wight and South of England Royal Mail Steam Packet Public Company Ltd) provides two ferry services from the Town Quay area in Southampton to the Isle of Wight. The Fast Passenger Ferry service runs to Cowes (which is called "West Cowes" by Red Funnel) in 22 minutes. It is provided by the Red Jet catamarans: 4, 6 and 7. A fourth ferry in Red Funnel's fleet,  is dedicated to freight traffic, entering service in May 2019.

Hythe ferry

There has been a passenger ferry from Town Quay to the village of Hythe, across Southampton Water, since the Middle Ages. This cuts out a lengthy journey by land across the mouth of the River Test. A 2000 ft (610m) pier opened in 1881; a 2-foot (576mm) gauge railway, the oldest pier railway in the world, has run along it since 1922. White Horse Ferries of Swindon, the former operator, was replaced in 2017 by the Blue Funnel Group. The crossing takes about 15 minutes.

Port services

Towage

Four companies operate tugs in the port area. Solent Towage, based at Fawley, operates four fire-fighting tugs. Svitzer Marine operates a number of fire-fighting tugs based at Dock Head. Williams Shipping operates a small fleet of tugs, workboats and barges.
Itchen Marine, based on the Itchen River, operates a fleet of tugs, mooring launches and barges.

Bunkering
John H Whitaker operates a small fleet of tankers offering bunkering and other services to the cruise ships visiting the port.

Boats and small ships

Marinas
Marina facilities are available at Hythe Village Marina across Southampton Water to the south, and at several locations on the River Itchen. Close to the Itchen Bridge there is the Ocean Village Marina to the south of the bridge and to the north there is Itchen Marine Towage's marina along with their tug fleet. Shamrock Quay and Saxon Wharf marinas lie on the western side of the river further upstream, while Kemps Quay marina is on the eastern side. Town Quay marina has a central location close to the Red Jet fast ferry berths. Hythe Village and Shamrock Quay have each been awarded "5 Gold Anchors" classifications from The Yacht Harbour Association. Ocean Village has 3 "Gold Anchors". The Eastern Docks is home to a variety of transport companies and marine service providers, including Williams Shipping who occupy 21 Berth. Towards the western end of the Docks area there are additional berthing and anchoring possibilities, at Marchwood Yacht Club and Eling Sailing Club.

Harbour and local pleasure cruises
Blue Funnel Cruises offer harbour cruises to view the ships in port, as well as other short day cruises in the Solent area, and "Party Night" type trips etc. The Barkham family began the operation in the 1930s; the current name was adopted in 1965. They run three vessels, Ocean Scene, Ashleigh R and Jenny R from Ocean Village.

PS Waverley, the last seagoing paddle-steamer in the world, runs a small number of slightly longer day cruises from Southampton each year. 

 is a heritage ship included in the National Historic Fleet (as is Waverley) and based at Southampton. She is the largest seaworthy working steamship of her type in Britain and probably Europe. As a "Clyde sludge boat", she spent her working life dumping treated sewage, first from Glasgow, later from Southampton. Restored now and managed by a charity, she operates an excursion programme, in addition to providing educational and other services.

Boat show
The first Southampton International Boat Show took place in 1969. It has been held annually ever since and has become the biggest water-based event of its type in Europe. It usually takes place over ten days in September. The venue is Mayflower Park, overspilling into land at a nearby hotel, and also onto a 1.25-mile (2km) network of temporary pontoons in the water. Around 350 of the boats are exhibited afloat at these pontoons, where potential customers have the opportunity to try them out.

Outer areas of the port

Southampton Water

Eastern shore
South of Woolston, Southampton has a shingle beach within its boundaries at Weston Shore. The area is popular for sailing small dinghies; in the Solent area, over 60 dinghy sailing clubs cater for this pastime. This is in addition to the 70 plus yacht and sailing clubs and 40 marinas for bigger vessels.

Just beyond the Southampton boundary lies Netley village, famous for its well-preserved medieval Cistercian monastery, Netley Abbey.  Royal Victoria Country Park on the shore is centred on a chapel which is all that survives of what, when completed in 1836, was the longest building in the world. This is the Royal Victoria Military Hospital, or Netley Hospital, Britain's largest military hospital when in use. It treated 50,000 war wounded from WW I, 68,000 casualties of WW II, and many others before, between and since.

Hamble-le-Rice is the next village to the south. Today it is known to yachtsmen as "the heart of British yachting"; the village is set in a river estuary noted for its wildlife. There is a small oil terminal slightly further north on Southampton Water.  For much of the last century, however, Hamble was the village with three airfields, at the centre of an area with up to 26 aircraft manufacturers. The Hamble Aerostructures factory remains busy today. It was a centre for air training from 1931 to 1984. Sir Winston Churchill was one of the many thousands who took flying lessons here. To the south of the village, lies the site of an Iron Age promontory hillfort, Hamble Common Camp.

Across the river Hamble, and linked to it by a small ferry for passengers and pedal cyclists, lies Warsash. This is the last village before the border of the area controlled by ABP Southampton with that controlled by the Queen's Harbourmaster Portsmouth. The River Hamble itself, the third of the three rivers that formed Southampton Water, is controlled by its own harbour authority.map

Warsash is another village in which sailing plays an important role, and also has a history of shipbuilding.  In addition it is the home of the Maritime Academy, which provides training for future Merchant Navy Officers. Its famous model ships, used for practising operation of large marine vessels picture were moved in May 2011 from their old base at Marchwood to a new one near Timsbury. The seven ton (tonne) models are powered, and have control systems which simulate the realistic handling of real ships. The new facility for them at Timsbury Lake near Romsey features models of berths, ship canal locks, narrow channels etc. for use in training the next generation of ships' officers.

Western shore

Across the Solent from Warsash, the ABP Harbour limit is at Stone point, near Lepe Country Park. The Department of Transport has responsibility for the safety of navigation within the Western Solent beyond this limit, as it lies outside the jurisdiction of any of the harbour authorities. The foreshore from here to Calshot, the first village to the north-east, is a lightly frequented and rather muddy beach.

At Calshot, with the long row of beach huts, the beach is shingle, and there is much of historical interest. Calshot Castle, built by Henry VIII to govern the port approach stands on Calshot Spit, a mile long (1.6 km) shingle bank, and housed a military garrison until as late as 1956. The area was a base and centre of activity for military flying boats. The hangars along the spit for them now accommodate a large activities centre, with climbing walls, velodrome and dry ski slope. There are also stations and facilities for the lifeboat and coastguard services. Saxon landings in 495, Lawrence of Arabia, the Schneider Trophy and the world's first port radio and radar station all also feature in the history of this tiny village. Beyond Calshot lies the oil-fired 1GW Fawley Power Station; beyond that is the huge Fawley Oil Refinery, with its associated piers for tankers.

Away from the built up areas and industrial facilities, the western shore is dominated by salt marshes, with some reeds. The next village is Hythe, which is associated with Sir Christopher Cockerell. The father of the modern hovercraft lived here for a long time. His friend, Lawrence of Arabia, also lived here, but only for a short time. Hovercraft development and manufacture took place principally at Cowes and Woolston, but also at other locations in the Solent area. There is a museum devoted to them at Lee-on-Solent to the East.

The Hythe Village marina is situated to the north of the village. Between this marina and the Marchwood Military Port,  of land extending from the shore to a line roughly 900 yards (1 km) inland, is owned by ABP. It is held in reserve for, and likely eventually to be used for, further development of the container port. It adjoins part of the eastern boundary of the New Forest National Park, and port development proposals are always highly emotive and contentious locally.

River Itchen

The Itchen Bridge is a road bridge that charges tolls, connecting the docks area with Woolston. In 1977 it replaced a chain ferry known as the floating bridge, which had been operating since 1838.

Storage warehouses once lined the banks of the lowest part of the river, but have been demolished. North of the bridge, on the western side, there are yards and wharves used by coastal vessels. These handle low-value, non-perishable and non-urgent bulk goods, including timber, scrap, metals, cement, sand and other quarry products. This trade accounts for 24 per cent by weight of internal goods transport in Britain. The imposing modern structure of St Mary's Stadium – the home of Southampton F.C. – stands close to the river here, just inland of the coasters' yards.

A shipbuilding firm, Day Summers & Co. was active between 1840 and 1929 in this area. The final vessel to be built there was the last floating bridge – no 14, which spent its working life a mile downstream, and is still in use today, albeit as a restaurant in Bursledon five miles away. Today this part of the river is occupied by the marinas, and also by many more small wharves, quays and shipyards, which provide homes for small to medium-sized boating-related businesses. The next two crossings are Northam Bridge, a part of the city's main eastern approach route, linking Bitterne Manor to Northam, and the railway bridge which carries the lines linking Southampton with Portsmouth and Brighton.

Upstream of these, only a little commercial activity takes place on the river or its banks. Some residences having river frontages use them as moorings for small boats, and a number of private houseboats are berthed. One more large road bridge, Cobden Bridge, connects St Denys and Bitterne Park. More houseboats are berthed to the north of it on the Western side, otherwise the riversides are occupied by parkland and the Portswood Sewage Treatment Works for much of the next stretch, as far as Woodmill Bridge. The tidal section of the river, for which the Port of Southampton is the navigation authority, ends here. The river Itchen upstream is noted as one of the world's premier chalk streams for fly fishing.

River Test

Car storage compounds within the docks now extend close to the bridges carrying the main Southampton – Bournemouth railway line and the busy A35 dual carriageway. The tidal section of the river, and the area of the navigation authority of The Port of Southampton, end in Redbridge, at a point close to these transport structures. The name of the bridge here comes from the abundant reeds in the area – "Reedbridge"; it was never red in colour. The River Test is even more famous than the Itchen in the world of fly fishing.

The village of Eling, with its sailing club and moorings for small boats, faces the container terminal to the south-west. It features a Norman parish church, one of the two working tide mills left in Britain, and a mediæval toll bridge that still charges users.

Two miles of undeveloped foreshore, mainly reeds, shingle and mud lie downstream from Eling, opposite the container port; then comes industrialised Marchwood, facing the western docks. A high-efficiency gas-fired 840 MW power station opened here in early 2010, replacing an older facility. The prominent 360 ft (110m) wide by 118 ft (36m) high aluminium dome is an electricity-generating refuse incinerator known as Marchwood Incinerator; it too has recently replaced an outdated predecessor. There is also a sewage treatment works. Leaving the industrial estate comes Cracknore Hard. This area was home to Husband's Shipyard, famed for wooden military craft including minesweepers, and also yachts and fishing boats. The British Military Powerboat Team more recently assembled an interesting collection of historic military powerboats in the old Husband sheds, but they have left and gone to Portsmouth. A marina and hotel are planned for this site. Beyond lies Marchwood Military Port.

Other activities

Other port-related activities include:
Shipping agents
Provisions for cargo and passenger ships
Ships' chandlers
Freight forwarders
Security
Warehousing
Harbourmaster
HM Revenue & Customs
 UK Visas and Immigration
Southampton Port health services
Hampshire Constabulary Marine Support Unit
HM Coastguards Maritime Rescue Coordination Centre Lee-on-Solent
Royal National Lifeboat Institution – The Calshot Lifeboat
Areas for angling, jet-skiing, waterskiing, windsurfing etc.
Port maintenance crews
Cruise-ship cleaning
Engineering support for ships
The Southampton Seafarers Centre
Waste collection
Stevedores and terminals
Cargo processors
Tugs
Pilots
The VTS (Vessel Traffic Services) Centre Control Room
Mooring services
Dredging
Fuel supplies
Port towage
Container repair
Container storage
Freightliner Rail
Pre-delivery inspections for vehicle importers
PT Contractors Ltd. – (resident building and civil engineering contractors)
Headquarters – Marine Accident Investigation Branch of the Department for Transport
Headquarters – Maritime & Coastguard Agency
H. J. Baker Sulphur Forming Plant.

References
 

 
Southampton
Container terminals